Denis Igorevich Soynikov (born 3 June 1986) is a former Russian professional football player.

Club career
He played in the Russian Football National League for FC Avangard Kursk in 2007.

External links
 

1986 births
Sportspeople from Kursk
Living people
Russian footballers
Association football midfielders
FC Spartak Tambov players
FC Avangard Kursk players
FC Oryol players